is the 42nd single by the Japanese idol girl group AKB48. It was released in Japan on December 9, 2015. As of February 22, 2016 (issue date), it has sold 1,041,763 copies. It was number-one on the weekly Oricon Singles Chart and was also number-one on the Billboard Japan Hot 100.

Background
The title track of this single marks Minami Takahashi's first time to hold an unshared choreography center position since 2006's "Sakura no Hanabiratachi". The B-side track "365 Nichi no Kamihikōki" is a gentle, medium-tempo song. It won Excellent Work Award in the 58th Japan Record Awards, Best Theme Song in 88th The Television Drama Academy Award and 11th Taisho Ryou Music Award.

Release
The single will be released in nine versions: Type A (two editions: limited and regular), Type B (limited and regular), Type C (limited and regular), Type D (limited and regular), and a version called a "Theater Edition". All versions, except the Theater Edition, include a DVD with four music videos (there's a music video for every song included in the particular version) and a video related to Minami Takahashi.

For the first time since "Chance no Junban", AKB48 did not sell a million copies of a single within the first week after the release, breaking the so-called Million Streak that had started since "Everyday, Kachuusha". Kuchibiru ni Be My Baby still managed to sell a million copies after several weeks. "Kuchibiru ni Be My Baby" sold 905.490 copies in 2015, making it the 4th best selling single of the year, according to the Oricon.

Music video
The music video for the title track was directed by Eiki Takahashi, who had already directed several music videos for the group. The full version (included only in limited editions) lasts for 13 minutes and was published along with the release of Kimi wa Melody (43rd single). On , A Full version was released on official AKB48 YouTube channel.

Track listings
All lyrics were written by Yasushi Akimoto.

The first two tracks are the same for all versions.

Type A

Type B

Type C

Type D

Theater Edition

Personnel

"Kuchibiru ni Be My Baby"
The senbatsu (member selection/lineup) for the song consists of 16 members. The center (choreography center) is Minami Takahashi.
 AKB48 Team A: Anna Iriyama, Haruna Kojima, Haruka Shimazaki, Minami Takahashi, Yui Yokoyama
 AKB48 Team K: Minami Minegishi
 AKB48 Team B: Yuki Kashiwagi, Rena Kato, Yuria Kizaki, Mayu Watanabe
 SKE48 Team S: Jurina Matsui
 NMB48 Team N: Sayaka Yamamoto
 HKT48 Team H: Rino Sashihara
 HKT48 Team KIV: Sakura Miyawaki
 NGT48: Rie Kitahara
 SNH48 Team SII: Sae Miyazawa

"365 Nichi no Kamihikōki"
The "Asa ga Kita senbatsu" (member selection/lineup) for the song consists of 16 members. The "center" is Sayaka Yamamoto.
 AKB48 Team A: Anna Iriyama, Haruna Kojima, Haruka Shimazaki, Minami Takahashi, Yui Yokoyama
 AKB48 Team B: Yuki Kashiwagi, Rena Kato, Yuria Kizaki, Mayu Watanabe
 SKE48 Team S: Jurina Matsui
 NMB48 Team N: Sayaka Yamamoto
 NMB48 Team BII: Miyuki Watanabe
 HKT48 Team H: Haruka Kodama, Rino Sashihara
 HKT48 Team KIV: Sakura Miyawaki
 NGT48: Rie Kitahara

"Kimi wo Kimi wo Kimi wo"
The "Next Generation Senbatsu" (member selection/lineup) for the song consists of 16 members. The "center" is Haruka Kodama.

Team A: Nana Owada, Megu Taniguchi
Team K: Yuka Tano, Mion Mukaichi, Tomu Muto
Team B: Ryoka Oshima
Team 4: Nana Okada, Saya Kawamoto, Mako Kojima, Haruka Komiyama, Juri Takahashi, Miki Nishino, Yuiri Murayama
Team 8: Nagisa Sakaguchi
Team BII: Miyuki Watanabe
Team H: Kodama Haruka

"Madonna no Sentaku"
The "Renacchi Sousenkyo Senbatsu" (member selection/lineup) for the song consists of 16 members. The "center" is Natsumi Tanaka.

Team A: Anna Iriyama, Shimazaki Haruka, Ami Maeda
Team K: Yuka Tano, Mion Mukaichi, Shinobu Mogi
Team B: Ryoka Oshima, Kato Rena 
Team 8: Nanami Sato
Team E: Sato Sumire
Team N: Yamamoto Sayaka
Team M: Miru Shiroma
Team H: Yui Kojina, Natsumi Tanaka, Natsumi Matsuoka
Team KIV: Murashige Anna

"Ama Nojaku Batta"
Team 8's song. The "center" is Ikumi Nakano.

 Team 8: Abe Mei, Iwasaki Moeka, Okabe Rin, Oguri Yui, Ota Nao, Oda Erina, Onishi Momoka, Kita Reina, Gyoten Yurina, Kuranoo Narumi, Kondo Moeri, Sakaguchi Nagisa, Sato Akari, Sato Shiori, Sato Nanami, Shitao Miu, Shimizu Maria, Shimoaoki Karin, Takaoka Kaoru, Takahashi Ayane, Tani Yuri, Tanikawa Hijiri, Cho Kurena, Nakano Ikumi, Nagano Serika, Hashimoto Haruna, Hattori Yuna, Hama Sayuna, Hamamatsu Riona, Hayasaka Tsumugi, Hitomi Kotone, Hidaritomo Ayaka, Hirose Natsuki, Fukuchi Rena, Fujimura Natsuki, Honda Hitomi, Miyazato Rira, Mogi Kasumi, Yoshida Karen, Yaguchi Moka, Yamada Nanami, Yamamoto Ai, Yamamoto Ruka, Yokomichi Yuri, Yokoyama Yui, Yoshikawa Nanase, Yoshino Miyu

"Senaka Kotoba"
Minami Takahashi's graduation song.
 AKB48 Team A: Anna Iriyama, Haruna Kojima, Haruka Shimazaki, Minami Takahashi, Yui Yokoyama, Nana Owada
 AKB48 Team K: Minami Minegishi, Mion Mukaichi
 AKB48 Team B: Yuki Kashiwagi, Rena Kato, Yuria Kizaki, Mayu Watanabe
 AKB48 Team 4: Haruka Komiyama, Juri Takahashi
 SKE48 Team S: Jurina Matsui
 NMB48 Team N: Sayaka Yamamoto
 HKT48 Team H: Rino Sashihara
 HKT48 Team KIV: Sakura Miyawaki
 NGT48: Rie Kitahara
 SNH48 Team SII: Sae Miyazawa

"Yasashii Place"
Team A's song. The "center" is Haruka Shimazaki & Sakura Miyawaki.

 Team A: Iriyama Anna, Iwata Karen, Oya Shizuka, Owada Nana, Ogasawara Mayu, Kojima Natsuki, Kojima Haruna, Sasaki Yukari, Shimazaki Haruka, Shiroma Miru, Takahashi Minami, Takita Kayoko, Taniguchi Megu, Nakanishi Chiyori, Nakamura Mariko, Nishiyama Rena, Hirata Rina, Maeda Ami, Miyazaki Miho, Miyawaki Sakura, Yamada Nanami, Yokoyama Yui

"Oneesan no Hitorigoto"
Team K's song. The "center" is Mion Mukaichi.

 Team K: Aigasa Moe, Abe Maria, Ishida Haruka, Ichikawa Manami, Kodama Haruka, Shinozaki Ayana, Shimada Haruka, Shimoguchi Hinana, Suzuki Mariya, Takajo Aki, Tano Yuka, Nakata Chisato, Nakano Ikumi, Nagao Mariya, Fujita Nana, Matsui Jurina, Minegishi Minami, Mukaichi Mion, Muto Tomu, Mogi Shinobu, Yumoto Ami, Yamamoto Sayaka

"Kin no Hane wo Motsu Hito yo"
Team B's song. The "center" is Rena Kato & Yuria Kizaki.

 Team B: Iwasa Misaki, Uchiyama Natsuki, Umeta Ayano, Oshima Ryoka, Kashiwagi Yuki, Kato Rena, Kizaki Yuria, Kobayashi Kana, Goto Moe, Sakaguchi Nagisa, Takeuchi Miyu, Tatsuya Makiho, Tanabe Miku, Fukuoka Seina, Yabuki Nako, Yokoshima Aeri, Watanabe Mayu, Watanabe Miyuki

"Nanka, Chotto, Kyuu ni"
Team 4's song.

Team 4: Iino Miyabi, Izuta Rina, Iwatate Saho, Okawa Rio, Omori Miyuu, Okada Ayaka, Okada Nana, Kawamoto Saya, Kitagawa Ryoha, Kitazawa Saki, Kojima Mako, Komiyama Haruka, Sato Kiara, Shibuya Nagisa, Takahashi Juri, Tomonaga Mio, Nishino Miki, Nozawa Rena, Murayama Yuiri

"Sakki Made wa Ice Tea"
The "Mushi Kago" (member selection/lineup) for the song consists of 12 members. The "center" is Haruka Komiyama & Shu Yabushita.

Team B: Goto Moe, Fukuoka Seina
Team 4: Haruka Komiyama
Team 8: Nagisa Sakaguchi
SKE48 Kenkyuusei: Obata Yuna, Goto Rara
Team M: Uemura Azusa
Team BII: Shu Yabushita
HKT48 Kenkyuusei: Aramaki Misaki, Maria Imamura
NGT48 Kenkyuusei: Oguma Tsugumi, Moeka Takakura

Other versions
 The Thai idol group BNK48, a sister group of AKB48, covered the song "365 Nichi no Kamihikōki" and named it "Sam Roi Hoksip Ha Wan Kap Khrueangbin Kradat" ("365 Days with Paper Planes"). First performed on 2 June 2017 at the group's debut event in Bangkok, the song was included on the group's debut single, "Aitakatta – Yak Cha Dai Phop Thoe", officially released on 8 August 2017.
 MNL48, AKB48's sister group in the Philippines, made a Filipino version of the song "365 Nichi no Kamihikōki" and titled it "365 Araw ng Eroplanong Papel" ("365 Days of Paper Airplane"). This was the idol group's third single, which was released on 11 April 2019.
 Indonesian idol group JKT48, a sister group of AKB48, covered the song "365 Nichi no Kamihikōki" in Indonesian version and it's called "Pesawat Kertas 365 Hari" ("365 Days of Paper Planes"). the song was included on the group's album Mahagita.

Release history

References

AKB48 songs
MNL48 songs
2015 singles
2015 songs
Songs with lyrics by Yasushi Akimoto
King Records (Japan) singles
Oricon Weekly number-one singles
Billboard Japan Hot 100 number-one singles
BNK48 songs